Chenoweth is an unincorporated community in Range Township, Madison County, Ohio, United States.

Chenoweth was never platted. The community has the name of John Chenoweth, a pioneer settler. The Chenoweth Post office was established on October 12, 1887, but was discontinued on September 15, 1900.  The mail service is now sent through the Mount Sterling branch.  As of 1915, the community contained one grocery store, one blacksmith, and a small cluster of houses.

References 

Unincorporated communities in Madison County, Ohio
Unincorporated communities in Ohio